The  Arizona Cardinals season was the franchise's 98th season, 77th in the National Football League and ninth in Arizona. The team improved upon their previous output of 4–12, winning seven games. Despite this improvement, the Cardinals failed to qualify for the playoffs for the fourteenth consecutive season.

The low point of the season was providing a notorious New York Jets team with its only win in front of fewer than thirty thousand people. This was the first time the Cardinals had opposed the Jets since 1978. The reason for this is that before the admission of the Texans in 2002, NFL scheduling formulas for games outside a team’s division were much more influenced by table position during the previous season.

This was Boomer Esiason's only season with the Cardinals as he would re-sign with the Cincinnati Bengals after this season.

Offseason

NFL Draft

Personnel

Staff

Roster

Regular season

Schedule

Game summaries

Week 4: at New Orleans Saints

Week 5: v St. Louis Rams

Week 6: Bye

Week 7: at Dallas Cowboys

Week 8: v Tampa Bay Buccaneers

Week 9: v New York Jets

Standings

References 

Arizona Cardinals seasons
Arizona Cardinals
Arizona